Ghana is a unitary presidential constitutional democracy, located along the Gulf of Guinea and Atlantic Ocean, in the subregion of West Africa. A multicultural nation, Ghana has a population of approximately 27 million, spanning a variety of ethnic, linguistic and religious groups. Five percent of the population practices traditional faiths, 71.2% adhere to Christianity and 17.6% are Muslim. Its diverse geography and ecology ranges from coastal savannahs to tropical jungles. Ghana is a democratic country led by a president who is both head of state and head of the government. Ghana's economy is one of the strongest and most diversified in Africa, following a quarter-century of relative stability and good governance. Ghana's growing economic prosperity and democratic political system have made it a regional power in West Africa.

Notable firms 
This list includes notable companies with primary headquarters located in the country. The industry and sector follow the Industry Classification Benchmark taxonomy. Organizations which have ceased operations are included and noted as defunct.

See also 
 Ghana Stock Exchange
 GSE All-Share Index
 Economy of Ghana
 List of Shopping Malls in Ghana

References 

 

Ghana